Randall Ladouceur (born June 30, 1960) is a Canadian ice hockey coach and former player, who last served as an assistant coach of the San Antonio Rampage. He previously served as an assistant coach for the Montreal Canadiens, Hamilton Bulldogs and Toronto Maple Leafs.

Ladouceur played in the NHL as a defenceman from 1982 to 1996. He played for the Detroit Red Wings, Hartford Whalers and the Mighty Ducks of Anaheim. He played a total of 930 regular season games, scoring 30 goals and 126 assists for 156 points, collecting 1322 penalty minutes.  He also played 40 playoff games in his career, scoring 13 points (5 goals and 8 assists). Ladouceur was a team captain for both Hartford and Anaheim. Ladouceur is the last player to wear sweater number 19 for Detroit, prior to the arrival of Steve Yzerman.

Ladouceur previously served under Paul Maurice as an assistant coach of the Carolina Hurricanes between 1997 and 2004. On May 7, 2008, he was fired by interim Maple Leafs GM Cliff Fletcher, along with head coach Maurice. On July 31, 2013, Ladouceur was named an assistant coach of the Lake Erie Monsters of the American Hockey League

Ladouceur was born in Brockville, Ontario. He currently resides with his family in Brockville.

Career statistics

References

External links
 Hockey Hall of Fame
 Toronto Maple Leafs official web site

1960 births
Adirondack Red Wings players
Brantford Alexanders players
Canadian ice hockey coaches
Canadian ice hockey defencemen
Detroit Red Wings players
Carolina Hurricanes coaches
Hartford Whalers captains
Hartford Whalers coaches
Hartford Whalers players
Ice hockey people from Ontario
Kalamazoo Wings (1974–2000) players
Living people
Mighty Ducks of Anaheim players
Montreal Canadiens coaches
National Hockey League assistant coaches
Sportspeople from Brockville
Toronto Maple Leafs coaches
Undrafted National Hockey League players